Bellport is a village in the Town of Brookhaven in Suffolk County, on the South Shore of Long Island, in New York, United States. The population was 2,084 at the 2010 census. 

The Incorporated Village of Bellport is named after the Bell family, early settlers of the area. South Country Road (Main St.) in the village features small businesses such as antique shops, artist galleries, small inns, restaurants, and a service center. These family-run businesses get community support from the Bellport Chamber of Commerce. Bellport is also home to the Gateway Playhouse, a professional summer theater in operation since 1950.

History
The land that is now Bellport was purchased along with what is now the hamlet of Brookhaven (then called Fireplace Neck) and western South Haven from the Unkechaug Indians in 1664 by settlers from nearby Setauket, who were attracted by the plentiful harvests of salt hay. The part that became Bellport was named Occumbomock Neck. Jonathan Rose was the first permanent settler in the 1680s, and by 1720 the Rose family owned much of Occumbomock Neck. In 1829, Captain Thomas Bell, a Scottish immigrant, bought land there. He sold sections of it, and by 1843 the village had 30 dwellings and 200 inhabitants. He changed the name to Bell-Port (now Bellport), envisioning a seaport, since Bellport was very close to the Old Inlet, a breach in the barrier island Fire Island, which gave Bellport easy access to the open ocean. With Colonel William Howell, Bell built a dock and a road to the dock. But the breach healed over, and Bellport instead became a tourist attraction, with wealthy visitors coming by railroad and then coach from New York City. Although all seven hotels eventually closed, the last in the 1950s, Bellport remained associated with wealthy New Yorkers, who eventually established year-round residences. After World War II, nearby Camp Upton was converted into Brookhaven National Laboratory, bringing in more, highly educated, year-round residents.

Bellport was incorporated as a village in 1910. On July 4, 1980, the Bellport Academy and Bellport Village Historic District were listed on the National Register of Historic Places.

On March 8, 1963, Bellport High School burned down. No one was killed, but 40 students and teachers were hospitalized. The replacement school was built in Brookhaven, but is still called Bellport High School.

On November 26, 1983, the New York Pyrotechnic Products Company factory (now known as Fireworks by Grucci) just north of the village exploded, killing two and injuring 24. The explosion had the effect of an earthquake, causing significant damage to hundreds of homes.

Geography 

The village of Bellport is on the shore of Bellport Bay, an arm of the Great South Bay.

Ho Hum Beach
Village residents and their guests are welcome to visit the beach. Surfers, sunbathers, and fishermen especially enjoy its privateness. Ho Hum Beach offers a bathing area, a screened-in snack shack and showers on the bay side of the beach. The Whalehouse Point ferry runs from the Bellport Village Marina from late May to early September. Village residents can buy round-trip ferry tickets, and their guests may ride the ferry for an increased fare. Village residents are also welcome to ride their own boats over. Boat slips for non-residents are available for a fee.

Demographics

As of the census of 2000, there were 2,363 people, 993 households, and 684 families residing in the village. The population density was 1,619.7 people per square mile (624.9/km2). There were 1,139 housing units at an average density of 780.7 per square mile (301.2/km2). The racial makeup of the village was 95.13% White, 1.27% African American, 0.38% Native American, 1.65% Asian, 0.08% Pacific Islander, 0.21% from other races, and 1.27% from two or more races. Hispanic or Latino of any race were 1.78% of the population.

There were 993 households, out of which 23.0% had children under the age of 18 living with them, 58.4% were married couples living together, 7.8% had a female householder with no husband present, and 31.1% were non-families. 24.5% of all households were made up of individuals, and 12.5% had someone living alone who was 65 years of age or older. The average household size was 2.38 and the average family size was 2.86.

In the village, the population was spread out, with 18.7% under the age of 18, 4.6% from 18 to 24, 24.0% from 25 to 44, 32.2% from 45 to 64, and 20.4% who were 65 years of age or older. The median age was 46 years. For every 100 females, there were 90.6 males. For every 100 females age 18 and over, there were 89.8 males.

The median income for a household in the village was $77,523, and the median income for a family was $80,850. Males had a median income of $51,189 versus $40,985 for females. The per capita income for the village was $38,906. About 0.6% of families and 1.6% of the population were below the poverty threshold, including 0.9% of those under age 18 and 1.7% of those age 65 or over.

Government

The village is governed by four trustees and a mayor. Each trustee is elected to a two-year term, with two trustees up for election every year. The mayor is also elected to a two-year term.

Bellport is responsible for many local services, such as snow removal, road maintenance, and garbage removal. These are paid for by taxes on property within the village boundaries, which the Brookhaven town receiver of taxes collects. Education is the responsibility of the South Country Central School District, ambulance service is provided by the South Country Ambulance Company, fire service by the Bellport Fire District, and police service by the Suffolk County Police Department and Bellport code enforcement.

Education
The South Country Central School District serves the Bellport community. It has six schools, three elementary schools (kindergarten–grade 3), Frank P. Long Intermediate School (grades 4–5), Bellport Middle School (grades 6–8) and Bellport High School.

Transportation 
Bellport is served by three bus routes. The S66 operates along South Country Road from Patchogue to Riverhead, while the S68, which also begins in Patchogue, runs down Station Road and Bellport Avenue from Montauk Highway, though on some days it runs east along South Country Road toward Center Moriches. An alternate route of the 7B, which runs from Patchogue to the Eagle Estates development in Medford, also runs north along Bellport Avenue and Station Road, joining the regular route at Patchogue-Yaphank Road near Horseblock Road. The S68 and 7B also provide a direct connection to the Bellport LIRR station in the hamlet of North Bellport.

The main route through Bellport is South Country Road (Suffolk CR 36), a former section of Montauk Highway that runs west to east from East Patchogue to Brookhaven. The main south-north road is Bellport Lane, which becomes Bellport Avenue north of South Country Road. At the northern village border, the principal south-north route shifts to Station Road and runs toward West Yaphank, while Bellport Avenue becomes a minor local street that terminates at a dead end on the Montauk Branch of the LIRR, resuming its trajectory between Montauk Highway and the eastbound service road of Sunrise Highway at Exit 56. Other roads include Head of the Neck Road, which runs west through east from North Bellport and skirts the village's northern border east of Fairway Drive.

Notable people

 Tiki Barber, NFL player
 Amanda Burden, urban planner
 William Glackens (1870–1938), artist
 Felix Grucci, Fireworks by Grucci
 William Higinbotham (1910–1994), physicist at nearby Brookhaven National Laboratory; developed one of the earliest video games, Tennis for Two
 Bryan Johnson, NFL player
 Kirke La Shelle (1862-1905), journalist, playwright and theatrical producer
 Selina Maitreya (born 1955), international photography consultant and author
 Mike McAlary (1957–1998), journalist, Pulitzer Prize winner
 Samuel Irving Newhouse Jr. (1927–2017), magazine publisher
 Jacqueline Kennedy Onassis (1929–1994), first lady of the United States
 Arthur Pinajian (1914–1999), artist and comic book creator
 Billy Porter, actor, singer and style icon
 Charlie Rose, television talk show host
 Isabella Rossellini, actress
 Randy Smith (1948–2009), NBA player
 Elmer Ambrose Sperry (1860–1930), inventor of gyroscope and founder of Sperry Rail Service, the first internal rail flaw detection company
 William Weld, former governor of Massachusetts and New York gubernatorial candidate
 P. G. Wodehouse (1881–1975), English comic writer

References

External links
 Village of Bellport official website
 Village of Bellport news
 Bellport Chamber of Commerce

 

Brookhaven, New York
Villages in New York (state)
Villages in Suffolk County, New York
Populated coastal places in New York (state)
1910 establishments in New York (state)